New Quay is a seaside town (and electoral ward) in Ceredigion, Wales, with a resident population of around 1,200 people, reducing to 1,082 at the 2011 census. It remains a popular seaside resort and traditional fishing town, with strong family and literary associations with the poet Dylan Thomas, and his play, Under Milk Wood.

History
Until the early 19th century, New Quay consisted of a few thatched cottages surrounded by agricultural land, the natural harbour providing a safe mooring for fishing boats and a few small trading vessels. The New Quay Harbour Act was passed in 1834 and a stone pier was constructed at a cost of £4,700. Trading activity increased and new houses were built as economic migrants arrived. Shipbuilding began to take place and the town increased in size with the construction of terraced housing up the slopes of the sheltered bay.

By the 1840s, more than three hundred workmen were employed in shipbuilding in three centres, New Quay itself, Traethgwyn, a bay just to the north, and Cei-bach, a pebble beach further north below a wooded cliff. Here were constructed not only smacks and schooners for sailing along the coast, but also larger vessels for sailing to the Americas and Australia. At that time, as well as shipwrights, New Quay had half a dozen blacksmith shops, three sail makers, three ropeworks and a foundry. Most of the male inhabitants of the town were mariners or employed in occupations linked with the sea. Several of the old warehouses remain, having been put to new uses. Lengths of chain, metal rings and capstans, and a list of tolls for exports and imports can still be seen outside the harbourmaster's office.

By 1870, shipbuilding had ceased at New Quay but most of the men living there still went to sea. There were navigation schools in the town and many of the last square riggers that sailed the world were captained by New Quay men. Between 1850 and 1927, the Board of Trade issued 1,380 Merchant Master and Mate certificates to New Quay men.  

In 1907, a local newspaper noted that “New Quay... has more retired sea captains living in it than any other place of its own size in Wales.” 
At the 1939 War Register, there were 58 sailors (active and retired) living in New Quay, of whom 30 were master mariners, with more at sea who were not included in the Register.

Governance
New Quay is the name of the electoral ward which is coterminous with the community. Since 1995 the ward has elected one county councillor to Ceredigion County Council. 

At the local level, New Quay Town Council is composed of ten councillors.

Tourism and attractions 
Key attractions for holidaymakers include the picturesque harbour and expansive sandy beaches, as well as opportunities, including boat trips, to see the population of bottlenose dolphins that lives in Cardigan Bay. The town has a heritage centre and marine wildlife centre, as well as a tourist information centre. Nearby New Quay Honey Farm, the largest bee farm in Wales, has a live bee exhibition and sells honey, mead and beeswax. The outskirts of the town feature many large holiday parks and caravan sites.

The annual Cardigan Bay Regatta, usually in August, has been conducted since at least the 1870s. Events now include inshore sports (swimming, rowing, etc.) and dinghy and cruiser racing.

There are extensive beach walks, as well as cliff walks along the Coastal Path, south to Llangrannog and north to Aberaeron.

The National Trust's Llanerchaeron estate is just a short drive away, as is the 18th century Ty Glyn Walled Garden in Ciliau Aeron. Less than an hour's drive away, you'll find the neolithic Pentre Ifan Burial Chamber, as well as the Castell Henllys Iron Age Village. Restored steam trains on the Vale of Rheidol Railway  leave from nearby Aberystwyth on the scenic route to Devil’s Bridge.

Local facilities 
As well as shops, restaurants and pubs, New Quay has a large primary school, a doctors' surgery, a small branch of the county library service, a fire station and a Memorial Hall. There is also a public park at the top of New Quay next to the tennis court. New Quay Bowling Club is on Francis Street, at the top of the town. New Quay Golf Club first appeared in 1909, but closed in the 1920s. The nearest golf club today is Cardigan Golf Club.

In addition to the hospitality industry, there is still significant employment in sea fishing and fish processing.

New Quay Lifeboat Station, operated by the RNLI, houses two lifeboats: a Mersey class named Frank and Lena Clifford of Stourbridge in dedication to its main benefactors and an inshore inflatable D class. In 2014 the station celebrated 150 years of service, during which period it made 940 callouts. 

Public transport is provided by regular bus services to Aberaeron, Cardigan and Aberystwyth. The town has never had a train service, as schemes to open routes to Cardigan or Newcastle Emlyn were abandoned in the 1860s, and that from the Aberaeron to Lampeter branch line (the Lampeter, Aberayron and New Quay Light Railway) was never completed due to the First World War.

Dylan Thomas 

Dylan and Caitlin Thomas lived in New Quay from September 4, 1944, until July 1945, renting a cliff-top bungalow called Majoda. There were several other families from Swansea living in New Quay, who had come after the bombing of Swansea in 1941. His childhood friend and distant cousin, Vera Killick, lived next to Majoda, whilst her sister, Evelyn Milton, lived further along the cliff-top.  Thomas also had an aunt and four cousins in New Quay, as well as a more distant relative, the First World War fighter pilot ace, James Ira Thomas Jones, aka Ira Taffy Jones.

Thomas had previously visited New Quay in the 1930s  and then again in 1942-43 when he and Caitlin had lived a few miles away at Plas Gelli, Talsarn. His New Quay pub poem Sooner than you can water milk dates from this period, as does his script for the filming of Cardigan Bay for the final part of Wales - Green Mountain, Black Mountain. 

One of Thomas' patrons was Thomas Scott-Ellis, 8th Baron Howard de Walden, whose summer residence was Plas Llanina, an historic manor house perched on the cliffs at Cei Bach, just a short walk away from Majoda. He encouraged Thomas to use the old apple house at the bottom of the manor's walled garden as a quiet place in which to write. It would have been an inspirational setting, and one Dylan Thomas scholar has suggested that the stories about Llanina's drowned houses and cemetery are "the literal truth that inspired the imaginative and poetic truth" of Under Milk Wood. Another important aspect of that literal truth was the sixty acres of cliff-top between Majoda and New Quay, including Maesgwyn farm (a name that appears in Under Milk Wood), that fell into the sea in the early 1940s.

New Quay, said Caitlin, was exactly Thomas's kind of place, "with the ocean in front of him...and a pub where he felt at home in the evenings” and he was happy there, as his letters reveal. His ten months at Majoda were the most fertile period of his adult life, a second flowering said his first biographer, Constantine FitzGibbon, "with a great outpouring of poems." These Majoda poems, including making a start on Fern Hill, provided nearly half the poems of Deaths and Entrances, published in 1946. There were four film scripts as well,  and a radio script, Quite Early One Morning, about a walk around New Quay. This radio script has been described by Professor Walford Davies as "a veritable storehouse of phrases, rhythms and details later resurrected or modified for Under Milk Wood."  Not since his late teenage years had Thomas written so much. His second biographer, Paul Ferris, concluded that "on the grounds of output, the bungalow deserves a plaque of its own." Thomas’s third biographer, George Tremlett, concurred, describing the time in New Quay as “one of the most creative periods of Thomas’s life.” 

New Quay is often cited as an inspiration for the village of Llareggub in Under Milk Wood. Walford Davies, for example, has concluded that New Quay "was crucial in supplementing the gallery of characters Thomas had to hand for writing Under Milk Wood."
FitzGibbon had come to a similar conclusion, noting that "Llareggub resembles New Quay more closely [than Laugharne] and many of the characters derive from that seaside village in Cardiganshire..."  Writing in January 1954, just days before the first BBC broadcast of the play, its producer, Douglas Cleverdon, noted that Thomas "wrote the first half within a few months; then his inspiration seemed to fail him when he left New Quay..." And one of Thomas's closest friends, Ivy Williams of Brown's Hotel, Laugharne, has said "Of course, it wasn't really written in Laugharne at all. It was written in New Quay, most of it."

Thomas's sketch of Llareggub is now online at the National Library of Wales. The Dylan Thomas scholar, James Davies, has written that "Thomas's drawing of Llareggub is...based on New Quay." There's been very little disagreement, if any, with this view. A recent analysis of the sketch has revealed that Thomas used the name of an actual New Quay resident, Cherry Jones, for one of the people living in Cockle Street.

Llareggub's occupational profile as a town of seafarers, fishermen, cocklers and farmers has been examined through an analysis of the 1939 War Register, comparing the returns for New Quay with those for Laugharne, Ferryside and Llansteffan. It shows that New Quay and Ferryside provide by far the best fit with Llareggub's occupational profile.

The writer and puppeteer, Walter Wilkinson, visited New Quay in 1947, and his essay on the town captures its character and atmosphere as Thomas would have found it two years earlier. There is, too, an online 1959 ITV film of the town and its people during the summer holiday season.

Much of the location filming for The Edge of Love, a 2008 film based around Thomas and Caitlin's friendship with Vera Killick, was carried out in and around New Quay. It starred Sienna Miller, Keira Knightley, Matthew Rhys and Cillian Murphy. The film, said the scriptwriter, Sharman Macdonald, was a work of fiction: it was "not true, it's surmise on my part, it's a fiction… I made it up." One incident in the film that Macdonald did not make up was the shooting at Majoda in March 1945, after which Vera's husband, William Killick, was charged with attempted murder and later acquitted.

The Dylan Thomas Trail runs through Ceredigion, in west Wales. It was officially opened by Dylan and Caitlin's daughter, Aeronwy Thomas, in July 2003. The trail is marked by blue plaques, with information boards in New Quay, Lampeter and Aberaeron. Two photographic online guides to the New Quay section of the Trail are also available. There are also a number of accessible day walks, including the Rev. Eli Jenkins' Pub Walk, which follows the river Dewi to the sea, passing close to the farm of the Cilie poets.

Thomas and his family left New Quay in July 1945. By September, he was writing to Caitlin about finding somewhere to live, telling her he would live in Majoda again. He came back to New Quay at least twice in 1946, the first time in March, a visit he records in his radio broadcast, The Crumbs of One Man’s Year, in which he writes about the “gently swilling retired sea-captains” in the back bar of the Black Lion. Then, in early summer, he was seen in the Commercial pub with jazz pianist, Dill Jones, whose paternal family came from New Quay. Thomas's letter in August 1946 to his patron, Margaret Taylor, provides a vivid roll-call of some of the New Quay characters that he knew. 

Thomas also refers to New Quay in his 1949 broadcast, Living in Wales (“hoofed with seaweed, did a jig on the Llanina sands...”). He was still in touch in 1953 with at least one New Quay friend, Skipper Rymer, who had briefly run the Dolau pub in New Quay.

Other Notable People 
 Towyn Jones (1858–1925), clergyman, politician and MP for Carmarthenshire East and later Llanelli.
 Elizabeth Mary Jones (‘Moelona’, 1877-1953), teacher, novelist and translator, including the works of Alphonse Daudet. 
 Florrie Evans, (1884–1967) a local resident and daughter of a New Quay seaman, is reported to have started the 1904 Welsh Christian revival in New Quay. She went on to be a preacher and a missionary to India.
 Geraint Bowen, (1915–2011), Welsh language poet, academic and political campaigner.
 Dill Jones, (1923–1984), a jazz stride pianist.
 Ryan Andrews (born 1981), film director, music video director and production designer.

Plas Llanina 

Plas Llanina is a mile or so to the north of New Quay on the cliffs above Traethgwyn and Cei Bach beaches. It is considered a good example of a small-scale, post-medieval gentry house.  It has a chequered history, including some interesting owners and various stories associated with them. It belonged to the Musgrave family from around 1630. By the end of the 18th century it had passed into the ownership of the Jones family, the last of whom was Edward Warren Jones. When he died, he left the Llanina Estate to his two godchildren, Mrs Charlotte Lloyd (of Coedmore) and her younger brother, Charles Richard Longcroft. The house remained with the Longcrofts until about 1920, its last owner being Air Vice Marshal Sir Charles Alexander Holcombe Longcroft (1883-1958) who had been born and brought up at Llanina. He is considered a founding father of the Royal Air Force.

Sometime in the late 1930s, the house and grounds were rented by Lord Howard de Walden as a summer residence. In the late 1940s, it was bought by Colonel J. J. Davis and Betty Davis, who later moved to Ty Glyn in Ciliau Aeron. By 1964, Plas Llanina was derelict. It was subsequently bought in 1988 and rebuilt by a London banker.

The house sits next to the church of Saint Ina, with a public footpath to both the church and the beach.

References

External links

 Rod Atrill: New Quay Then and Now in Photos: New Quay Then and Now
 Rod Atrill: A Brief History of New Quay in Photos: A brief history of New Quay, West Wales.
 Rod Atrill: The Dylan Thomas Trail in New Quay: The Dylan Thomas Trail at New Quay
 Andrew Dally: An Early Morning Walk Around New Quay, 2016: On the trail of Dylan Thomas in New Quay 
 D. N. Thomas: A Postcard from New Quay and other essays on Dylan Thomas, New Quay and Under Milk Wood:  A Postcard from New Quay
 D. N Thomas:  New Quay, Llareggub and the 1939 War Register: Llareggub and the 1939 War Register
 D. N. Thomas: Dylan, Vera and The Edge of Love film:  The Edge of Love: the Real Story
 Dylan Thomas: A Sketch of Llareggub, National Library of Wales: Dylan's Sketch of Llareggub with an analysis by D. N. Thomas at

Reading
 R. Bryan (2012) New Quay: A History in Pictures, Llanina Books.
 R. Bryan (2014) The New Quay Lifeboats: 150 Years of Service and Courage, Llanina Books
 S. Campbell-Jones (S.C. Passmore) (1974/75) Shipbuilding at New Quay 1779-1878 in Ceredigion, 7, 3/4.
 J.A. Davies (2000) Dylan Thomas's Swansea, Gower and Laugharne, University of Wales Press.
 W. Davies and R. Maud, eds.(1995) Under Milk Wood: the Definitive Edition, Everyman.
 C. Edwards-Jones (2013) New Quay Wales Remembered, Book Guild Publishing.
 P. Ferris (ed.) (2000) The Collected Letters: Dylan Thomas, Dent.
 J.G. Jenkins (1982) Maritime Heritage:The Ships and Seamen of Southern Ceredigion, Gomer
 W. J. Lewis (1987) New Quay and Llanarth, Aberystwyth.
 S. C. Passmore (1986) New Quay at the time of the 1851 Census, Ceredigion, 3,5.
 S.C. Passmore (2012) Farmers and Figureheads: the Port of New Quay and its Hinterland, Grosvenor.
 S. C. Passmore (2015) The Streets of New Quay, Lulu Press
 S. W. Rhydderch (2015) Ceredigion Coast: Llareggub and the Black Lion in A Dylan Odessey: 15 Literary Tour Maps, ed. S. Edmonds, Literature Wales/Graffeg.
 D. N. Thomas (2000) Dylan Thomas: A Farm, Two Mansions and a Bungalow, Seren.
 D. N. Thomas (2002) The Dylan Thomas Trail, Y Lolfa.
 D. N Thomas (2004) The Birth of Under Milk Wood in Dylan Remembered vol. 2 1935-1953, Seren.
 D. N. Thomas (2014) A Postcard from New Quay in Ellis, H. (ed.) (2014) Dylan Thomas: A Centenary Celebration, Bloomsbury 
 M. de Walden (1965) Pages from My Life, Sidgewick and Jackson.
 W. Wilkinson (1948) Puppets in Wales, Bles.

 
Towns in Ceredigion
Beaches of Ceredigion
Coast of Ceredigion
Wards of Ceredigion
Ports and harbours of Wales
Seaside resorts in Wales
Communities in Ceredigion